Cirque Éloize is a contemporary circus company founded in Montreal in 1993 by Daniel Cyr, Claudette Morin, Jeannot Painchaud and Julie Hamelin.

Since 2004, it has its headquarters and creation studio in Old Montreal inside the former Dalhousie Station, a historical building where the National Circus School (French: École nationale de cirque) was based from 1989 to 2003.

Cirque Éloize creates shows destined for indoor tours and sometimes for the big top. At other times, it creates custom shows for Dalhousie Station, or for client chosen venues.

Cirque Éloize has carried out more than 5,000 performances in over 550 cities and 50 countries. Its repertoire is composed of 15 key shows, and it has performed in excess of 1,600 custom-made shows across the world.

Etymology 
"Éloize" means "heat lightning" in Acadian French ("éclair de chaleur" in Standard French). The word appears to come from Saintongese language (of western France), but has appeared at least once (spelled "eloise") in a book written by Montaigne in classical French.

It is used in Acadia and in the Magdalen Islands, which the artists of the first Cirque Éloize troupe were all natives of. The thunderbolt depicts their acrobatic and spectacular side, the heat, and their humanity that wishes to touch the heart and soul.

Cyr Wheel 
Daniel Cyr, cofounder of Cirque Éloize, invented the Cyr Wheel and popularized it by obtaining a silver medal with his act at the Festival Mondial du Cirque de Demain in 2003. The Cyr Wheel has since been present in the majority of Cirque Éloize' creations. Having become an entire discipline of its own, the technique is now taught in many professional schools and used by numerous artists from various countries.

Tailored events and concepts 
Cirque Éloize designs, creates, and produces tailored concepts and events for corporate, private, or governmental clients in its Dalhousie Station venues and across the world. More than 1,600 custom-made events have been carried out around the globe in varying contexts and locations.

Cirque Éloize collaborated in the Turin Winter Olympic Games Closing Ceremony in 2006; in the inauguration of the Jaeger-Lecoultre boutique at Place Vendôme Paris in 2012; and in l'Heure Bleue, an exclusive show presented all summer long as part of Montreal city's 375th anniversary festivities, in 2016. Cirque Éloize was a featured company at the first edition of the Biennale Internationale des Arts du Cirque in 2015. Orchestre Symphonique de Montreal presented an outdoor event along with Cirque Eloize in August 2018 based on symphonic suite Scheherazade.

Productions

Seul ensemble (2019–) 
Staged by Benoit Landry, Seul ensemble is a hommage to Serge Fiori's music. Using mostly songs from his band Harmonium, five dancers and 15 acrobats  perform the show periodically in Montréal and Québec City.

Hotel (2018–) 
Staged by Emmanuel Guillaume, Hotel is Cirque Éloize' 25th anniversary creation. The premiere took place at the Foxwoods Resort Casino in August 2018.

Nezha (2018–playing) 
Nezha tells the story of a young orphan abandoned on a mysterious island. Rightful heir of the Red Flags, she will have to face her destiny to become, in her own way, the most fearsome pirate of all time.

This family-friendly show, staged by Frédéric Bélanger, combines dance, acrobatics, martial arts and visual projections under the roof of an exterior amphitheater. Presented at the Shawinigan Cité de l'Énergie, Nezha is Cirque Éloize' first semi-permanent show. It premiered on July 5, 2018.

Saloon (2016–on tour) 
Inspired by the Far West's heritage, Saloon is animated by an original score written and produced by Éloi Painchaud, including excerpts from Patsy Cline and Johnny Cash classics. Throughout the comedy infused chapters, 11 artists, three of which are musicians, bring the western age back to life with the help of dance, song and acrobatics.

The Canadian premiere of the show took place at the St-Tite Western Festival in 2016.

Saloon's staging is done by Emmanuel Guillaume, scenography and accessories by Francis Farley, lighting by Francis Hamel, costumes by Sarah Balleux, choreography by Annie St-Pierre, soundscape by Colin Gagné and makeup by Virginie Bachand.

Cirkopolis (2012–on tour) 
Created in 2012, Cirkopolis is a show staged by Jeannot Painchaud and the choreographer Dave St-Pierre & Lambden. Cirkopolis inspires itself from the aesthetics of the Fritz Lang film Metropolis. The scenographer Robert Massicotte, videographer Alexis Laurence, costume creator Liz Vandal, lighting designer Nicolas Descôteaux, acrobatics designer Krzysztof Soroczynski, and the composer Stéphan Boucher are the other main creators of the show. On stage, 11 artists defy monotony and push the limits imposed by a mill town with lashes of absurd comedy, animating chaos and bursts of colors.

In 2018, Cirkopolis became the first show in Saudi Arabia to present women on stage in front of an audience composed of both men and women.

Awards and nominations 
2014 : Drama Desk Awards, New York City
 Recipient of the Unique Theatrical Experience

iD (2009–2017) 
Staged by Jeannot Painchaud, iD unites circus arts with urban dances such as B-boying, breakdancing and hip-hop. The scenographer, Robert Massicotte, videographer, Alexis Laurence, costume designer, Linda Brunelle, lighting designer, Nicolas Descôteaux, acrobatics designer Krzysztof Soroczynski and the composers, Jean-Phi Goncalves and Alex McMahon, Contributing choreographer Lambden and Picakle are the other main creators of the show. 15 artists were present on stage, exploring a total of 13 different acrobatic disciplines.

In July 2010, iD is presented as the opening show for the first Montréal Complètement Cirque festival. Seen by million of spectators, in October 2016 iD celebrates its thousandth performance in London.

Awards and nominations 
2010 : Montreal Arts Council
 Grand Award given to Cirque Éloize " for the creation of its remarkable iD show which inaugurated the first edition of the international Montréal Complètement Cirque festival and for its exceptional international reach ".

Music-Hall de la Baronne (July 2 to 24, 2013) 
Le Music-Hall de la Baronne was created in collaboration with the Montréal Complètement Cirque Festival. Staged by Denis Bouchard, the cabaret type show was presented in Montreal during the Montreal Complètement Cirque festival in July 2013.

Nebbia (2007–2011)
Written and staged by Daniele Finzi Pasca, this Cirque Éloize and Teatro Sunil coproduction is the last chapter of the Trilogie du Ciel (Nomade, Rain, Nebbia). Signifying " fog " in Italian, the show broaches the dream and imaginary world.

Nebbia was designed by the same creative team as the two previous shows.

Rain: Comme une pluie dans tes yeux (2004–2012) 
Created in 2004,  Rain – comme une pluie dans tes yeux is the second chapter of the Trilogie du Ciel. Produced by Cirque Éloize and staged by Daniele Finzi Pasca, the show addresses the themes of childhood, freedom and family and is animated by an original staging where contemporary circus arts, theatre, music and dance intertwine. RAIN gives an exhibition of various circus disciplines: jugglery, banquine, Russian bar, clown, Cyr wheel, teeterboard, tightrope, contortion, aerial silk and hoop. Twelve artists from all corners of the world each embody their own character on stage, thus revealing their personal sensitivity and fragility.

RAIN has cumulated more than 980 performances and traveled across 179 cities and 20 countries. RAIN presents an original soundtrack composed by Maria Bonzanigo and Lucie Cauchon, costumes designed by Mérédith Caron, a scenography by Guillaume Lord and lighting by Martin Labrecque.

Awards and nominations 
2006 : Drama Desk Awards, New York City
 Nomination in "Unique theatrical experience" (RAIN)
 Nomination in "Exceptional musical director" (Daniele Finzi Pasca)
 Nomination in "Exceptional lighting" (Martin Labrecque)

2005 : Association de gestion théâtrale
 Reward for "the best theatrical show tour" for the series of shows presented at the Wales Millennium Centre.

2005: In review – San Francisco Chronicle Theater Robert Hurwitt
 Described as one of the 10 best shows presented in San Francisco in 2005.

Typo (2003–2007) 
TYPO is a show produced by Cirque Éloize, staged and performed by Jamie Adkins.

Nomade: La nuit, le ciel est plus grand (2002–2006) 
Created in 2002 and staged by Daniele Finzi Pasca, Nomade – La nuit, ciel est plus grand] –, is Cirque Éloize' fourth creation and the first chapter of the Trilogie du Ciel. In this show, song, music, dance and acrobatics are used to discuss the vagabond spirit of man and his quest for adventure. The trip is carried out from dusk until dawn to create infinite possibilities; at night, the sky is endless.

Lucie Cauchon's compositions are inspired by tzigane music, a reference that transpires and influences the theatricality. The costumes, by Mérédith Caron, are simple or sumptuous depending on the scene and participate in an aesthetic dominated by a certain sobriety, just like Martin Labrecque's lighting and Guillaume Lord's scenography.

NOMADE was presented in multiple theaters and international festivals, surpassing 700 total performance.

In 2007, it represented the province of Quebec and dominated the billboard for three weeks during the Universal Forum of Cultures in Monterrey, Mexico.

 Awards and nominations 
2005: Gémeaux Awards
 Nomination in Best Variety Special or Scenic Arts Special (Pierre L. Touchette, Alain Simard)
 Nomination in Best Direction in a Performing Arts Program or Series (Pierre Seguin)
 Nomination in Best Editing: comedy, variety, scenic arts (Patrice Bonenfant, François Bonnelly)

2005: Gemini Awards
 Nomination in Best Performance in a Performing Arts Program or Series (Troupe)

2006: Yorkton short film Festival
 Nomination in Performing Arts/Entertainment

 Cirque Orchestra (1999–2002) 
In 1999, on the initiative of the Lanaudière International Festival, Cirque Éloize produced Cirque Orchestra, its third creation.

Sharing the stage with a symphonic orchestra, this production meshed circus arts, contemporary dance and classical music, under an Alain Francoeur stage production.

Cirque Orchestra tells the story of a dissident musician that leaves his orchestra to join a world of fantasy where he wishes to learn to fly.

 Awards and nominations 
2003: Gemini Awards
 Laureate in the Best performance in a Performing Arts Program or Series category (Troupe)
 Nomination in the Best Direction in a Performing Arts Program or Series category (Pierre Séguin)

2003: Gémeaux Awards
 Nomination in Best Variety Special or Scenic Arts Special (Alain Simard, Luc Châtelain, Pierre L. Touchette)
 Nomination in Best Sound : comedy, variety, scenic arts, talk-show (Marcel Gouin)

 Excentricus (1997–2002) Excentricus is Cirque Éloize' second creation. This show's success, which united numerous scenic arts, can be summed up in four words: heart, warmth, talent and generosity. Far from the predictable parade of circus performances, the 17 artists – acrobats, jugglers, comedians, trapeze artists and musicians – storm the stage to evolve in a rich and subtle tango of emotions.

Acclaimed by the public and critics, Excentricus was presented over 500 times in performance venues all over the world as well as in prestigious international scenic arts festivals such as the Edinburgh Festival in Scotland, the Israël Festival in Jerusalem, the Hong Kong Festival in China, the Iberoamericano Teatro Festival of Bogota in Colombia and the Recklinghausen Festival in Germany. The show was also performed in many parts of United States through the Performing Arts Center network and the National Scenes network in France.

 Awards and nominations 
2002: Gémeaux Awards
 Nomination in Best Photographic Direction category: variety, comedy, sitcom or scenic arts (Ronald Plante)
 Nomination in Best Editing category: variety, comedy, sitcom or scenic arts (Vidal Béïque)
 Nomination in Best Program or Scenic Arts Series or Arts Documentary category (Anne-Marie Hétu, Philippe Dussault, Jacques Payette)

 Cirque Éloize (1993–1997) 
Cirque Éloize is the troupe's first show, at the time composed of seven madelinot artists who were still students of the National Circus School: Jeannot Painchaud, Daniel Cyr, Jano Chiasson, Robert Bourgeois, Damien Boudreau, Sylvette Boudreau et Alain Boudreau.

Combining dance and acrobatics, the show is created in the Station Dalhousie spaces, in Montreal, and then presented in the Magdalen Islands on the 11th and 12 August 1993 in the context of CFIM's 10th anniversary, a local community radio.

Three version of the eponymous show would be created between 1991 and 1994. The first two would be made as part of a collective work involving all the artists in the process, under the direction of Jeannot Painchaud and with Catherine Archambault in care of staging and choreographies. Pierre Boileau joins the team for the third version's staging which would lead the troupe to its first major breakthrough in the American market. The inauguration of the New Victory Theater on the 42nd street on Broadway, followed by a three-week series of representations, thereby marking the beginning of a grand journey.

 Other works 
In 2003, Cirque Éloize created the first circus arts festival in America: La Semaine des Arts du Cirque. Taking place in the Magdalen Islands, three summer editions of the festival were produced in total. Cirque Éloize is also cofounder of the Montréal Complètement Cirque festival.

In 2006, the company created the Éloize Foundation which has a three-fold mission: promote social reintegration of youth in difficulty, encourage youth to pursue superior or specialized studies and to contribute in the development of scenic arts.  Artcirq, an organisation putting its passion for circus at the service of Inuit youth, is based in Igloolik, Nunavut, Canada, and is the first group to benefit from this support.

Cirque Éloize and Zone3 worked in collaboration during the production of La Vie Est Un Cirque's four seasons. Broadcast in 2012, the series La Vie Est Un Cirque's IV was nominated at the Gémeaux Awards in the Best Variety or Scenic Arts Serie category (Michel Bissonnette, Louise Jobin, André Larin, Vincent Leduc, Brigitte Lemonde, Zone3) as well as in the Best Photographic or Lighting Direction category under comedy and all varieties category (Jean Amyot, Zone3) for its " L'évolution du Tango " episode. The serie was shot in Cirque Éloize' studio, which was also in charge of the artistic direction, casting and staging of the six episodes.

Under the invitation of the Chief Director and Curator, Nathalie Bondil, Jeannot Painchaud is chosen as one of the 20 artists participating in the Big Bang : carte blanche à la créativité exposition which was presented at the Montreal Museum of Fine Arts from November 6, 2011 to January 22, 2012.

In 2014, Jeannot Painchaud was responsible for the artistic direction of the Paris en Scène 1889–1914 exposition, presented from June 2013 until February 2014 at the Musée de la civilisation of Quebec. Paris en scène 1889–1914'' earned the Prix Excellence – Groupe institutionnel 1 attributed by the Société des musées québécois (SMQ).

References

External links
 Cirque Eloize

Circuses
Culture of Quebec